The Annals of St Neots is a Latin chronicle compiled and written at Bury St Edmunds in the English county of Suffolk between c. 1120 and c. 1140. It covers the history of Britain, extending from its invasion by Julius Caesar (55 B.C.) to the making of Normandy in 914. Like the Anglo-Saxon Chronicle, it is chiefly concerned with Anglo-Saxon history, but it differs from it in adopting a distinct East Anglian perspective on certain events and weaving a significant amount of Frankish history into its narrative.

Manuscript
Contrary to what the modern title may suggest, the work was not compiled at St Neots (Huntingdonshire). It owes its present title to antiquary John Leland, who in the 1540s – at the time of the Dissolution of the Monasteries – discovered the sole surviving manuscript at St Neots Priory. Palaeographical analysis has shown that two hands using Late Caroline script were at work, Scribe A for the first quire (pp. 1–18) and Scribe B for the remaining part. The script is typical of the first half of the 12th century and both hands have been detected in other manuscripts from Bury St Edmunds. According to Dumville, the evidence suggests then that the manuscript was compiled at Bury St Edmunds in Suffolk between c. 1120 and c. 1140.

After Leland's discovery, the manuscript passed into the possession of Matthew Parker (d. 1575), Archbishop of Canterbury, who supplied various annotations. Later, the dean of the college, Thomas Neville, donated the manuscript to Trinity College, Cambridge, where it is preserved up to this day, under the shelfmark R.7.28. It is bound together with several unrelated documents, forming the first 74 leaves of the compilation.

Notes

References

Further reading

English chronicles
Latin historical texts from Norman and Angevin England
Manuscripts in Cambridge
12th-century manuscripts